Ingalagi is a panchayat village in Belgaum district in the southern state of Karnataka, India.

There are two villages in the gram panchayat: Ingalagi and Yadahalli.

Demographics
In the 2001 India census, Ingalagi had a population of 3,359, with 1,741 males and 1,618 females.

In the 2011 census, the population of Ingalagi was reported as 3,965.

References

Villages in Belagavi district